Anthony Michael Arata (born October 10, 1957) is an American singer-songwriter. His best known song is "The Dance", a number-one U.S. country hit for Garth Brooks in 1990 which was nominated at the 33rd Grammy Awards for Best Country Song. He also wrote the 1994 No. 1 U.S. country hit "Dreaming with My Eyes Open" recorded by Clay Walker. Other artists who have recorded his songs include Suzy Bogguss, Lee Roy Parnell, Patty Loveless, Trisha Yearwood and Emmylou Harris Arata was inducted into the Nashville Songwriters Hall of Fame in 2012.

Arata was born and grew up in Savannah, Georgia, attended the Georgia Southern University, and moved to Nashville in 1986. During that time, he released an album called Changes for MCA Records and Noble Vision.

He recorded for Noble Vision Records in 1984, charting two singles on the Hot Country Songs charts. He also released an album, The Change.  In 2000, Arata released his album, Way Back Then. He released a further album Such Is Life, in 2005.

Other top-20 U.S. country hits written or co-written by Arata include "I'm Holding My Own", a No. 3 hit for Lee Roy Parnell in 1994, "Here I Am", a No. 4 hit for Patty Loveless, released in 1994, "The Man in the Mirror" (#17, Jim Glaser, 1983), and "The Change" (#19, Garth Brooks, 1995).

Discography

Albums

Singles

Song Writing Catalog

References

External links
 Official Website

Bibliography
 Barry McCloud (1995) Definitive Country: The Ultimate Encyclopedia of Country Music and Its Performers, p. 21-22,  .

1957 births
Living people
American country singer-songwriters
American male singer-songwriters
Writers from Savannah, Georgia
Musicians from Savannah, Georgia
Georgia Southern University alumni
Country musicians from Georgia (U.S. state)
Singer-songwriters from Georgia (U.S. state)